Rockland Mill Complex is a national historic district located at Rockland in Sullivan County, New York.  The district includes four contributing buildings and three contributing structures.  They include the grist mill (ca. 1850) containing much of its original machinery; remains of the original power canal, mill pond, and tailrace with stone retaining walls; tenant house (ca. 1850); proprietor's house (1867); and ice house (1867–1900).

It was listed on the National Register of Historic Places in 1984.

References

Grinding mills on the National Register of Historic Places in New York (state)
Historic districts in Sullivan County, New York
Grinding mills in New York (state)
Historic districts on the National Register of Historic Places in New York (state)
National Register of Historic Places in Sullivan County, New York